is a greatest hits album by Japanese rock band Southern All Stars. It was released on June 25, 1998. It was number-one on the Oricon Weekly Albums Chart. It is the 11th best-selling album in Japan by a Japanese artist with 3.479 million copies sold.

Track listing

Disc 1

Disc 2

Charts

References

1998 greatest hits albums
Japanese-language albums
1998 albums
Victor Entertainment compilation albums